Drewsville is an unincorporated community in the town of Walpole in Cheshire County, New Hampshire.

The village is located in the northeastern corner of Walpole, just south of the valley of the Cold River. New Hampshire Route 123 passes through the village, connecting it with Alstead to the east and the rest of Walpole (including North Walpole) and Bellows Falls, Vermont to the west.

Drewsville has a separate ZIP code (03604) from other areas in the town of Walpole.

References

Unincorporated communities in New Hampshire
Unincorporated communities in Cheshire County, New Hampshire
Walpole, New Hampshire